David Goldsmith (born 21 September 1993) is an English footballer who is currently a graduate assistant coach for college team the Butler Bulldogs.

Career

College career
Goldsmith played four years of college soccer at Butler University between 2013 and 2016. He tallied 41 goals and 9 assists in 70 total appearances with the Bulldogs and was named Big East Male Scholar-Athlete of the Year in 2016.

While at college, Goldsmith also played three seasons with USL Premier Development League side Michigan Bucks.

Professional career
On 21 March 2017, it was announced that Goldsmith had signed for North American Soccer League club Indy Eleven. He made his professional debut on 30 April 2017, as a late substitute in a 1–1 draw with Jacksonville Armada.

International career
Goldsmith was called up to the Wales U19 training camp.

References

Living people
1993 births
Association football forwards
Butler Bulldogs men's soccer players
Flint City Bucks players
Indy Eleven players
USL League Two players
North American Soccer League players
English expatriate sportspeople in the United States
English expatriates in the United States
English footballers
Expatriate soccer players in the United States
Footballers from Bristol
Nike Academy players